Robert Kenneth Killian (September 15, 1919 – June 25, 2005) was an American politician from Connecticut.

Early life and education
Killian was born in Hartford in 1919. He served as a first lieutenant in the United States Army for four years during World War II, commanding an infantry company. He received four battle stars and a Purple Heart and took part in island campaigns at Kwajalein, Palau, Mindanao, and Okinawa.

Career
After returning to the United States, Killian graduated from Union College with his Bachelor of Arts in 1942. He received his LL.B. from Hartford Law School on 1948. He was admitted to the bar in Connecticut in 1948 and joined his law school classmate Robert Krechevsky and Samuel Gould to found the Hartford law firm, Gould, Killian and Krechevsky (now Gould, Killian and Wynne).

He served as the city of Hartford's assistant corporation counsel from 1951 to 1954. He became chairman of the Hartford Democratic Town Committee in 1963 and is credited with helping to get elected Hartford's first African American councilman and state Senator. His friendship with John "Boss" Bailey, the state Democratic Party chairman, resulted in his appointment in 1967 as state Attorney General; Governor John N. Dempsey chose Killian to fill the vacancy left by Harold M. Mulvey. He won election in his own right three years later, one of only two Democrats to survive a Republican sweep of statewide offices, including the governorship.

In 1974, Killian was elected the 101st Lieutenant Governor of Connecticut on the ticket headed by Governor Ella Grasso. Displeased with the way the governor was handling issues including the state's fiscal crisis as her re-election approached, Killian waged a bitter primary campaign against Grasso in 1978. He lost and was replaced on the ticket by William A. O'Neill, who later succeeded Grasso as governor in 1980 after her resignation shortly before her death from cancer.

Last years
Killian then spent a decade as chairman of the Hartford Civic Center and Coliseum Commission. He died in Hartford in 2005, aged 85, and is interred at Mount Saint Benedict Cemetery in Bloomfield, Connecticut.

Other
Killian was a Roman Catholic and a member of the American Bar Association (ABA), the Elks, the Knights of Columbus and the Friendly Sons of St. Patrick.

While he was Connecticut Attorney General, Killian's office defended a 1970 decision by Connecticut's Commissioner of Motor Vehicles, John Tynan, to deny a drivers license to a man, David E. Follett, on the basis that he was "an admitted homosexual". Follett later killed himself.

References

External links
Profile from The Political Graveyard
Profile from the Connecticut Attorney General's Office

1919 births
2005 deaths
Lieutenant Governors of Connecticut
Connecticut Attorneys General
Connecticut Democrats
United States Army personnel of World War II
United States Army officers
Union College (New York) alumni
Politicians from Hartford, Connecticut
20th-century American politicians
Catholics from New York (state)
Catholics from Connecticut